John George Norman Bird (30 October 1924 – 22 April 2005) was an English character actor.

Early life
Bird was born in Coalville, Leicestershire, England. A RADA graduate, he made his West End debut in Peter Brook's production of The Winter's Tale at the Phoenix Theatre in 1951.  He was also a member of the BBC's Radio Drama Company. His first film appearance was as the foreman in An Inspector Calls (1954).

Film career
He was a familiar face to British cinema audiences of the 1950s and 1960s, appearing in nearly 50 films such as The Angry Silence (1960), The League of Gentlemen (1960), Whistle Down the Wind (1961), Victim (1961) and Term of Trial (1962) with Laurence Olivier and The Hill with Sean Connery (1965).

Television appearances
He had over 200 television appearances, notably as Mr Braithwaite in Worzel Gummidge (1979–81) and Mr Arrad in the Fawlty Towers episode "Waldorf Salad" (1979). His long list of credits include Steptoe and Son, Till Death Us Do Part, Rising Damp, Ever Decreasing Circles, Yes Minister, To Serve Them All My Days, All Creatures Great and Small, Z-Cars, Public Eye, The Saint, Department S, Randall and Hopkirk (Deceased) and Boon. In 1990 he appeared in Stay Lucky, with Dennis Waterman, which marked his 200th television appearance. One of his last film appearances was as a taxi driver in Richard Attenborough's Shadowlands (1993).

Personal life
At 16 he left school and spent six months working in an office before studying at the Royal Academy of Dramatic Art. During the Second World War, he served with Royal Air Force, being demobbed in 1947.

He had met his wife Nona Blamire (Joan Hood in radio's The Archers) in rep in Northampton. They married in 1953 and lived in Teddington for many years. In 1992 they moved to Bridgnorth, Shropshire, to be nearer to their two daughters and five grandchildren.

Filmography

Film

Television

References

External links
 
 Obituary in The Guardian
 Obituary in The Independent

1924 births
2005 deaths
Alumni of RADA
English male stage actors
English male film actors
English male television actors
People from Coalville
Male actors from Leicestershire
Royal Air Force personnel of World War II